Minor Basilica of the Immaculate Conception may refer to:

Manila Cathedral, in Manila, Philippines
Malolos Cathedral, in Malolos, Bulacan, Philippines
Minor Basilica of the Immaculate Conception (Batangas City), Batangas, Philippines 
Cathedral Basilica of the Immaculate Conception in Castries, Saint Lucia